Bianca Erwee (born 4 March 1990) is a retired South African heptathlete who saw success on continental level.

She won the bronze medals at the 2012 and 2014 African Championships and finished tenth at the 2013 Summer Universiade

Her personal best score was 5715 points, achieved in March 2013 in Germiston.

References

1990 births
Living people
South African heptathletes
Competitors at the 2013 Summer Universiade